Tripucka is a surname belonging to a family of professional athletes.  Notable people with this surname include:

Frank Tripucka (1927–2013), American football player who played in the NFL, CFL and AFL, father of Kelly
Kelly Tripucka (born 1959), American retired basketball player who played in the NBA, son of Frank
Travis Tripucka (born 1989), American football player in the NFL, son of Kelly